Carrie is a 2002 supernatural horror television film, based on the 1974 novel of the same name by Stephen King. It is the second film adaptation and a re-imagining of the novel, and the third film in the Carrie franchise. The film was written by Bryan Fuller, directed by David Carson, and stars Angela Bettis in the leading role. In the story, Carrie White, a shy girl who is harassed by her schoolmates, disappears and a series of flashbacks reveal what has happened to her. Unlike the 1976 film, this film is much more faithful to the book.

An international co-production film between Canada and United States, Carrie was produced by Trilogy Entertainment Group and MGM Television at the request of television network NBC. Filmed in Vancouver, it was commissioned as a stand-alone feature by the network but the studios intended it as a backdoor pilot for a potential television series. The ending of the novel was changed accordingly, but no follow-up series was ever produced.

The film premiered on NBC on November 4, 2002, when it was viewed by 12.21 million people. Despite the good ratings and two award nominations (a Saturn Award and ASC Award), the film was poorly received by film critics. The performances, especially Bettis', were praised, but the film was criticized for its poor special effects, lack of a horror atmosphere, and long runtime.

Plot 
Police interview several people, including high school student Sue Snell and gym teacher Miss Desjarden. Detective John Mulcahey is currently investigating the disappearance of a high school student and suspect of arson, Carrie White. These interviews reveal the preceding events.

One week before the prom at Ewen High School, Carrie is a shy girl who is bullied by the popular girls, most notably Chris Hargensen and Tina Blake. When Carrie has her first period in the shower, the girls taunt her until Ms. Desjarden intervenes and comforts Carrie. Principal Morton decides to send Carrie home but addresses her by the wrong name. An infuriated Carrie yells out, causing Morton's desk to move several inches. Making her way home, Carrie is accosted by a boy on a bicycle, whose joke goes wrong when he inexplicably flies off his bike and crashes into a tree. On arrival at her house, Carrie has a flashback of her childhood. Her fanatically religious mother, Margaret White, who considers menstruation a sign of sexual sin, locks Carrie in her "prayer closet" as punishment.

The next day, Ms. Desjarden gives the girls a week's detention for their bullying of Carrie. If any of them plans on skipping detention, they will be suspended and therefore banned from the prom. Chris is the only one who refuses to do so, so she is banned from prom. After Chris' father, John Hargensen, a lawyer, unsuccessfully attempts to rescind the ban, she enlists her boyfriend, Billy Nolan, to get revenge on Carrie. Meanwhile, Carrie discovers she has telekinesis, the ability to move objects with her mind. After a telekinetic episode in class, Carrie goes home and practices her talent. Sue, who feels sorry for tormenting Carrie, hires her boyfriend, Tommy Ross, to take Carrie to the prom. With some trepidation, Carrie agrees. When she tells her mother about the prom invitation, Margaret forbids her to go. At last, Carrie is provoked into using her powers to confront her mother and Margaret seemingly gives in.

On the day of the prom, Tina switches the prom ballots so that Carrie and Tommy are elected the Prom King and Queen. As Tommy and Carrie take their place onstage, Chris, who has been hiding in the rafters with Billy, pulls a rope, causing a wave of pig blood to fall onto Carrie. Chris releases the rope and the bucket falls on Tommy's head, killing him. Carrie goes into a shock-induced trance and locks everyone inside the gym, killing them all, except for a few students who escape through a vent with Ms. Desjarden. Carrie then leaves the burning school to walk home, unleashing a wave of destruction throughout the town. When Chris and Billy see Carrie walking, Billy tries to run her down but Carrie tosses their truck into a pole, killing them.

When Carrie arrives home, she gets into a bathtub, where she finally snaps back to herself but cannot remember what has just happened. Margaret comes into the bathroom to deem her daughter a witch for destroying the town and then attempts to drown her in the tub. With her last ounce of strength, Carrie stops her mother's heart. Sue finds Carrie and manages to revive her by administering two breaths. At Sue's suggestion, Carrie fakes her own death and Sue sneaks her out of town to Florida. As the two drive off, Carrie has a nightmarish vision of her mother. When she wakes up, she hallucinates Chris lunging at her. Noticing this, Sue asks her if she wants to stop for a moment, but Carrie tells her to keep driving.

Cast

Production 

In May 2002, television network NBC commissioned a film adaptation of Stephen King's novel Carrie. Filming started the following month in Vancouver, British Columbia, Canada, on June 12, and took at least twenty days. King had no involvement in this version after another film adaptation, The Rage: Carrie 2 (1999), disappointed him. It was produced by MGM Television and Trilogy Entertainment Group based on a screenplay by Bryan Fuller.

The network originally wanted a "movie-of-the-week", but the studio wanted to capitalize on the production so it was planned as a backdoor pilot for a potential television series. Although the producers tried to be faithful to King's novel, in order to allow for a continuation of the story, the ending was changed so that Carrie remained alive. Fuller had earlier considered the idea of giving Carrie's abilities to Sue or the creation of "another Carrie", but he deemed killing a character "who is victimized her entire life" as "really cruel". Another adaptation was developed with the intention of creating a sub-plot for the series, featuring Jasmine Guy as a paranormal investigator, but was ultimately scrapped.

Envisaged as a remake of Brian De Palma's 1976 film, Fuller aimed to "give it [...] a little more of an epic feel" rather than the fairy tale-feeling Fuller ascribed to the original. He also thought his version could add "a little more depth" with "some scope to the characters and the situation", which was not present in the original. The writer said Bettis' portrayal of the role was meant to give Carrie a "more edgy" characterization instead of the "victim" feeling he believed Sissy Spacek gave to her in De Palma's film. In his words:

Fuller sought to update the film's 1970s setting to a contemporary one, aware that high-school violence, in particular, has changed since then. Because Fuller felt the Columbine High School massacre was still on people's recent memory, he was careful in addressing the film's "teenage vigilante" theme.

Release 
Carrie was first broadcast in the United States on NBC at 8 pm EST on November 4, 2002. According to Nielsen Media Research, the film was viewed by an estimated 12.21 million people. It had a 5.0/12 household rating among males aged 18–49, making it the third most-watched show for this demographic. Among women aged 18–34, it was the most-watched program with a 6.3/16 rating. Carrie also obtained the best 18–49 score for a single-part made-for-TV show since ABC's broadcast of Brian's Song in December 2001.

The film was later released in VHS and DVD formats by MGM Home Entertainment on August 12, 2003. Scream Factory released it in Blu-ray format as double feature along with The Rage: Carrie 2 on April 14, 2015; a Region A disc, it featured English-only subtitles and contained a new audio commentary with director David Carson and cinematographer Victor Goss.

Reception 
The film was poorly received by film critics; it currently has an approval of 20% on Rotten Tomatoes based on 10 reviews, with an average rating of 4.92 out of 10. The site's critics consensus reads: "This made-for-TV adaptation of Stephen King's classic fails to impress or bring anything new to the table, - or to the prom - paling even more in comparison to the 1970's memorable version".

Several critics questioned the necessity of a new Carrie, considering a remake of the original classic to be unneeded.
Peoples Tom Gliatto summarized it as a "pointless remake". Some reviewers considered it to be excessively derivative of De Palma's film, and others assessed it unfavorably in comparison to the 1976 film. Steve Johnson from the Chicago Tribune disagreed, arguing that the flashback structure, "make[s] it more than just a rehash of the first film". It also elicited praise from Ron Wertheimer, who wrote for The New York Times that the flashbacks and the new ending were creative ideas. John Levesque of Seattle Post-Intelligencer and Anthony Arrigo of Dread Central, however, felt the former alteration was not an improvement, calling the conclusion "so undramatic" and "undeniably weak", respectively.

While Johnson considered the film "a respectable piece of work" owing to an intelligent script that developed all of King's themes, Wertheimer classified it negatively within "the generic made-for-television standard". Ian Jane of DVD Talk opined Carrie was "decent enough" for the limitations of a TV film, and Arrigo said "the lack of cinematic quality" reflected the television standards of the 2000s. Although Wertheimer claimed that the film's drawbacks were not simply caused by the medium, he did make the criticism that the prom scenes were sapped by the commercial breaks: the filmmakers, he argued, should have opted for a shorter sequence. SF Gates Edward Guthmann also criticized the film's overall length, especially in regard to the prom scene, as he considered the "dramatic impact" was not enhanced. Phil Gallo of Variety  likewise felt some scenes were extended just to fit the time needed for the next break. Randy Miller III of DVD Talk said the home media release evidenced "gaps in the action" caused by the commercials.

The film's special effects were heavily criticized. Fuller himself called the effects "cheap". Levesque and Gallo found their usage to be excessive, and the former said the film suddenly "shifts into a special effects bonanza". Another common complaint was that the film was not scary, which lead Levesque to write that "the new 'Carrie' doesn't even fit the category [of scary-movie genre]". Gallo found that it deviated from horror in favor of "prurient side routes", mentioning Sofer's acting, as well as locker-room and post-coital scenes. Johnson made a similar remark on the sexual content.

Most of the praise the film received was directed towards its cast, although Wertheimer and Arrigo were critical about the acting. While Clarkson, McClure, and Keith were praised by more than one reviewer, Bettis' performance was especially praised. Linda Stasi of the New York Post was one of the those who thought a remake was unnecessary, so she had low expectations for the film. Stasi, however, concluded she had been "completely mistaken"; she was positively surprised by the acting and went so far as to state that Bettis should win an Emmy for her performance. Wertheimer remarked that Bettis expressed the character's emotions well, and lamented that the film "affords Ms. Bettis few opportunities for such genuine acting".

At the 29th Saturn Awards, Carrie was nominated for Best Single Television Presentation, but the winner was Taken. It was also nominated for the 2003 American Society of Cinematographers Awards in the "Movie of the Week or Pilot (Network)" category; CSI: Miamis "Cross Jurisdictions" won it.

Aftermath 
The production of the television series was subordinated to the film's audience ratings. Although it obtained "strong numbers", according to Variety, the series was never produced. Fuller and Bettis were expected to reprise their roles, and the writer had a concept in mind: he hoped to create a series in which Carrie had to deal with the remorse and the responsibility for killing several people. The series would also feature Carrie and Sue on a journey to help other people with telekinetic powers. Fuller wrote the outline for a second episode, but NBC had no interest on it, so MGM ended their deal. In Fuller's opinion, "the network [n]ever intended to do a series, they were just playing the studio".

Another remake based on the Carrie novel and the 1976 film was released in 2013. Directed by Kimberly Peirce and starring Chloë Grace Moretz, it was created after producers felt the 2002 version did not capture modern bullying. However, David Rooney of The Hollywood Reporter has described the 2002 film as a faithful adaptation of the novel.

Notes

References

External links 

 
 

2000s high school films
2000s teen horror films
2002 horror films
2002 television films
2002 films
Remakes of American films
American supernatural horror films
American films about revenge
American high school films
American horror films
Canadian horror films
Canadian films about revenge
Canadian high school films
Canadian teen films
Carrie (franchise)
Films about bullying
Films about child abuse
Films about mass murder
Films about proms
Films about school violence
Films about sexual repression
Films about telekinesis
Films based on American horror novels
Films based on works by Stephen King
Films directed by David Carson
Films set in 1985
Films set in 2002
Films set in the 1990s
Films set in Maine
Films shot in Vancouver
Horror film remakes
American horror television films
Matricide in fiction
Films about mother–daughter relationships
Films about pranks
Metro-Goldwyn-Mayer films
NBC network original films
Religious horror films
Television films as pilots
Television pilots not picked up as a series
Television shows based on works by Stephen King
Films about evangelicalism
American thriller television films
2000s English-language films
2000s American films